Mercy Chapel at Mill Run is an historic Carpenter Gothic-style church located at Selbysport, Garrett County, Maryland.  It is a one-story, one room frame structure built on an octagonal plan above a coursed stone foundation. The interior of the chapel is a fine example of local craftsmanship and is virtually unchanged since the 1870s. Two small graveyard plots lie adjacent to the chapel.  It is one of the most architecturally sophisticated and well-preserved octagonal buildings in Maryland, and one of only a dozen mid-19th-century octagonal buildings surviving in Maryland.

It was listed on the National Register of Historic Places in 1984.

References

External links
, including photo from 1979, at Maryland Historical Trust

Churches on the National Register of Historic Places in Maryland
Churches completed in 1874
19th-century churches in the United States
Churches in Garrett County, Maryland
Octagonal churches in the United States
Carpenter Gothic church buildings in Maryland
National Register of Historic Places in Garrett County, Maryland